Nitesh Pandey (born 17 January 1973) is an Indian actor who works in Hindi films and TV serials. He is better known for his role of Shah Rukh Khan's assistant in Om Shanti Om (2007).

Career
Pandey began doing theatre in 1990. In 1995, he got his first acting opportunity in a show called Tejas in which he played a detective. After a few episodes BITV ran into trouble because the satellite was lost. Nitesh Pandey has worked in serials like Manzilein Apani Apani, Astitva...Ek Prem Kahani, Saaya, Justajoo and Durgesh Nandini and in films including Om Shanti Om, Khosla Ka Ghosla. He also runs an independent production house - 'Dream Castle Productions' which produces Radio shows. Pandey did theatre shows like Aastha and Misal Pav with Sudha Chandran. His performance was noticed in Khosla Ka Ghosla.

Personal life
Nitesh married Ashwini Kalsekar in 1998 and they were separated in 2002. 
Later, Pandey married TV actress Arpita Pandey.

Filmography

Films

Television shows

References

External links

Indian male soap opera actors
Indian male film actors
Living people
Male actors from Uttarakhand
Male actors in Hindi cinema
1973 births